Paul Andrew Godwin Ramadge (born 6 June 1958) is an Australian journalist and knowledge-sector leader. He was editor-in-chief of The Age, a daily newspaper in Melbourne, from 2008 to June 2012. From 2012 to 2013, he was a Vice-Chancellor’s Professorial Fellow at Monash University and was the inaugural Director of the Australia-Indonesia Centre (2013–2016), based at Monash University but bringing together eleven universities in the two nations to drive collaborative research, strengthen relationships and networks, and analyse attitudes and perceptions.

Career

The Age
During his tenure at The Age, Ramadge reinforced the newspaper's reputation for agenda-setting investigative journalism and strengthened its coverage of Victoria, the nation and, in some measure, the world. He was praised for his impartial editorial leadership, recruiting and training a generation of journalists and introducing digital innovations. An award-winning iPad app was launched, along with a host of website products. New social media, database and interactive forms of journalism were introduced. The Age was the PANPA Newspaper of the Year at the time of his departure in 2012.

Other highlights of his editorship included forcing the Victorian Government to launch a parliamentary inquiry into sexual-abuse allegations against the clergy; a years-long investigation into allegations of bank note scams linked to the Reserve Bank of Australia; multi-media coverage – print, television and online – of state and federal election campaigns; and strong advocacy on climate change, asylum-seekers, and the need for progressive, innovative thinking at state and federal levels to reignite infrastructure developments in Australia.

The years 2008 to 2012 witnessed a severe tightening of the media market in Australia, and Ramadge was one of many editors forced to reduce staff numbers through voluntary redundancy programs.
 
Ramadge announced on 25 June 2012 that he was stepping down from his role, along with his Sydney Morning Herald counterparts, editor Amanda Wilson and publisher Peter Fray.

Monash University
In July 2012, Ramadge was appointed to the role of Vice-Chancellor’s Professorial Fellow at Monash University, working alongside the then Vice-Chancellor, Professor Ed Byrne. He was commissioned to conduct a campus-wide review of the university’s strategy in Indonesia. This involved an analysis of student and academic flows and projections as well as an appraisal of the opportunities and risks for Monash. 

The review led to the awarding of an honorary doctorate to the then Indonesian Vice-President, His Excellency Dr Boediono. 

In late 2013, Ramadge, working with a global-engagement team at Monash, developed a concept paper for the establishment of a new Australia-Indonesia Centre. The incoming Australian Government led by Prime Minister Tony Abbott embraced the idea, awarding $15million to Monash University over four years to pursue the centre’s core objectives. Between 2014 and 2016, the centre delivered new-to-market initiatives in bi-national collaborative research, leadership development and education, cultural exchanges, and analyses of attitudes and perceptions. The centre’s board was chaired by Mr Harold Mitchell AC.

PLuS Alliance
In 2017, Ramadge was appointed Managing Director of The PLuS Alliance, a collaboration between three of the world's leading research-intensive universities, King's College London, Arizona State University and UNSW Sydney. Apart from maximising education, research and knowledge-exchange collaborations between the universities, Ramadge had a mandate to develop "moonshot" initiatives to pursue solutions to pressing global challenges. This led, after substantial research and business-case development, to the establishment of TEDI-London, a new type of engineering university aimed at improving access to engineering for a different type of student, including women and students from minority backgrounds. TEDI-London, based at Canada Water in London's inner south, was officially launched in March 2020.

Other organisational affiliations
Since completing his time at The PLuS Alliance (August 2020), Ramadge has advised universities in Australia and in other key markets on international strategies, partnerships, market entry and cross-cultural initiatives. He is International & Alliances Practice Lead at Wells Advisory, which has teams in Australia and the UK and principal advisers in other key markets. 

In addition, Ramadge is Chair of The Dolphin Research Institute, a for-purpose organisation in Victoria that focuses on protecting dolphins, whales and their marine environment. He is also a board member of Mental Health Victoria, the peak body in Victoria for mental health, specialising in policy, advocacy, training and research.

References 

1958 births
Living people
Australian newspaper editors